Rock Bottom is the second solo album by former Soft Machine drummer Robert Wyatt. It was released on 26 July 1974 by Virgin Records. The album was produced by Pink Floyd's drummer Nick Mason, and was recorded following a 1973 accident which left Wyatt a paraplegic. He enlisted musicians including Ivor Cutler, Hugh Hopper, Richard Sinclair, Laurie Allan, Mike Oldfield and Fred Frith in the recording.

Background
The band Matching Mole disbanded soon after the release of Little Red Record in 1972, and Wyatt began composing the material that later appeared on Rock Bottom. The album's preparation was interrupted by an accident on the night of 1 June 1973. During a raucous party, at Vale Court, Hall Road, Maida Vale in London, an inebriated Wyatt fell from a fourth-floor bathroom window and was paralysed from the waist down. Wyatt has used a wheelchair ever since. He later called the event the beginning of his maturity and in hospital he continued to work on the songs that would appear on Rock Bottom "in a trance".  "I was just relieved that I could do something from a wheelchair", he said. "If anything, being a paraplegic helped me with the music because being in hospital left me free to dream, and to really think through the music."

Within six months he was back at work in the recording studio and appeared on stage at London's Rainbow Theatre with Pink Floyd and Soft Machine, who lent financial support by playing a benefit concert for him. Although the music itself is intense and often harrowing, and the lyrics to the songs are dense and obviously deeply personal, Wyatt has denied that the material was a direct result of the accident and the long period of recuperation. Indeed, much of the album had been written while in Venice in early 1973 prior to Wyatt's accident, where his partner and future wife (the poet Alfreda Benge) was working as an assistant editor on Nicolas Roeg's film Don't Look Now.

Recording
Having written most of the songs while in Venice, before his fall, Wyatt went to record them a few months after his accident. By the time he and Alfreda "were stuck for somewhere to stay, and one of the people who helped was Delfina Entrecanales, who had a farm in Wiltshire around a village called Little Bedwyn". Part of the album was recorded there. They brought a "recording van and parked it in a field behind and put cables through the windows, so it wasn’t really soundproofed – a few donkeys and tractors going by are on the tape". (Delfina Canales is "the" Delfina who owned the "wineglasses", "tray" and "small battery" included in the "Personnel" section bellow as played by Wyatt).   "The rest of the album was recorded at Virgins The Manor studio at Shipton-On-Cherwell and CBS Studios in London."

Music and lyrics

Artwork
Rock Bottom has been released with two different covers, both featuring artworks by Benge. The cover found on the original LP and several reissues is a pencil drawing of a scene at an ocean shore. The upper area of the cover, inspired by a Victorian-era book cover, depicts activity along the beach and off to the horizon, while the bottom third gives an underwater view of strange animal and plant life in the sea. Details include three teenage girls playing at the beach, a faraway steamer, seagulls and sandcastles. Benge intended the cover's subdued style to strike a contrast with the dominant trend of fantastical progressive rock album art, best typified by Roger Dean's science fiction-inspired artwork for Yes. At a time when "all the covers were getting more and more complicated, competing with each other for pizzazz", Benge said, "the only way to counter that ... was to be absolutely minimal and quiet."

Release

Promotion

Concert at Theatre Royal, Drury Lane

"I'm a Believer" single

Reception

Rock Bottom sold better than expected, and was released to acclaim from critics. The British musical press praised the album, with positive reviews in NME, Melody Maker, Sounds, and the Record and Radio Mirror. The album charted in the United States on Billboard FM Action—a chart that measured airplay of LPs on "progressive rock" radio stations—where it peaked at number 13 in 1975.

Village Voice critic Robert Christgau wrote of Rock Bottom in a retrospective review, "I'm at a loss to describe this album of 'drones and songs' conceived and recorded after Wyatt's crippling accident except to say that the keyboards that dominate instrumentally are of a piece with his lovely tortured-to-vulnerable quaver and that the mood is that of a paraplegic with the spirit to conceive and record an album of drones and songs."

Reviewing the album for Pitchfork in 2010, Douglas Wolk said:

Pitchfork listed it as the 98th best album of the 1970s. In 2015, NME ranked the album at 358 on its list of the 500 "greatest albums of all time."

Legacy

The opening track "Sea Song" was covered in 1985 by Tears for Fears for the B-side of the single "I Believe (A Soulful Re-Recording)", the original version of which was dedicated to Wyatt in the LP liner notes.

According to Roland Orzabal, "This track was the B-side to 'I Believe', which was so clearly inspired by Robert Wyatt that I thought it would be a good idea to cover one of his songs for the flip side. His voice in my opinion is one of the best, not something I felt I could match, but if I introduced one person to his music then it would have been worth it."

The North Sea Radio Orchestra, alongside John Greaves, Annie Barbazza and William D. Drake, performed the full album live in November 2018. On 17 May 2019, this recording was released on CD and vinyl as Folly Bololey: Songs From Robert Wyatt's Rock Bottom via Greaves' record label Dark Companion, including four bonus Wyatt covers. Liner notes for the album were provided by Massimo "Max" Marchini, Jonathan Coe and Wyatt himself, the latter writing that "the concert [was] a beautiful event for [him]" and that "[he felt] so honored and so grateful". The album was performed live again at Cafe Oto on 27 June 2019.

Track listing
All songs written by Robert Wyatt.

Personnel
Robert Wyatt – vocals, keyboards, percussion, slide guitar (2), James' drum (1, 3, 5), Delfina's wineglass (2), Delfina's tray and a small battery (3)
Mike Oldfield – electric guitar (6)
Gary Windo – bass clarinet, tenor saxophone (5)
Ivor Cutler – voice (3, 6), baritone concertina, harmonium (6)
Alfreda Benge – voice (5)
Mongezi Feza – trumpets (3)
Fred Frith – viola (6)
Hugh Hopper – bass guitar (2, 4, 5)
Richard Sinclair – bass guitar (1, 3,6)
Laurie Allan – drums (2, 6)

Production 
Nick Mason – producer
Steve Cox – engineer (at The Manor and on Delfina's Farm)
Dick Palmer – engineer (at CBS London)
Toby Bird – assistant engineer (at CBS London)

References

Notes

Citations

Sources

Bibliography

Print articles

Further reading

Robert Wyatt albums
1974 albums
Albums produced by Nick Mason
Virgin Records albums